is a 1955 Japanese film directed by Ishirō Honda.

External links

1955 films
Films directed by Ishirō Honda
Films produced by Tomoyuki Tanaka
Japanese black-and-white films
1950s Japanese films